Mona Reservoir is a large reservoir on Currant Creek in the north end of Juab Valley, Juab County, Utah. It was created in 1895 by the construction of an earthen dam.

External links 
  by the Utah Division of Water Quality

Reservoirs in Utah
Lakes of Juab County, Utah
Buildings and structures in Juab County, Utah
1895 establishments in Utah Territory